John Dowding (born April 27, 1957 in Oakville, Ontario) is a Canadian former ice dancer.  With partner Lorna Wighton, he won three gold medals at the Canadian Figure Skating Championships and finished sixth at the 1980 Winter Olympics.

Currently, Mr. Dowding resides in Fresno, California and is the owner of Champion Window Coverings.

Results
(with Lorna Wighton)

Navigation

References

1957 births
Canadian male ice dancers
Figure skaters at the 1980 Winter Olympics
Olympic figure skaters of Canada
Living people
20th-century Canadian people